The Honeynet Project is an international security research organization, dedicated to investigating the latest attacks, developing open source security tools to improve Internet security and learn how hackers behave.

History 
The Honeynet Project began in 1999 as a small mailing list of a group of people.

Over time, the group expanded and officially dubbed itself as The Honeynet Project in June 2000.

The project includes dozens of active chapters around the world, including Brazil, Indonesia, Greece, India, Mexico, Iran, Australia, Ireland, and many in the United States.

Project goals 
The Honeynet Project focuses on three primary goals:

Raise awareness of the existing threats on the Internet.
Conduct research covering data analysis approaches unique security tool development, and gathering data about attackers and malicious software they use.
Provide the tools and techniques used by The Honeynet Project so that other organizations can benefit.

Research and development 
The Honeynet Project volunteers collaborate on security research efforts covering data analysis approaches, unique security tool development, and gathering data about attackers and malicious software they use. The Project research provides critical additional information, such as their motives in attacking, how they communicate, when they attack systems, and their actions after compromising a system. Such information is provided through Know Your Enemy white-papers, The Project blog posts, and Scan of the Month Forensic challenges.

The project uses normal computers, without any known vulnerabilities, and monitors the network for attacks.

See also
Cyber security
Honeypot (computing)

References

External links 
 Honeynet Project Home Page
 Honeynet Project Blog

Computer network security
501(c)(3) organizations
Organizations established in 1999
1999 establishments in Michigan
Free software project foundations in the United States